Damodardev  (1488–1598) was sixteenth century Ekasarana preceptor from Nalaca, Nagaon. Damodardev was a follower of Sankardeva's Ekasarana dharma order.  He started his own order after the death of Sankardeva that came to be called the Brahmasamhati, which admitted Brahmanical rituals and greater adherence to the caste system alongside the namadharma of Sankardev. He was succeeded by Bhattadeva.

Early life
Damodardev was born in a village called Nalaca in (in present-day Nagaon) in the 1488, the third and youngest son of Sushila and Satananda a Brahmin couple.  Nalaca was close to Bordowa than, Sankardev's native place, and Satananda was Sankardev's friend. Damodardev and his family moved from the Ahom  territories after Sankardev moved from Dhuwahat to Barpeta in 1546 and settled, after some wandering close to Patbausi, or Chandravatipura near Sankardev's sattra. Damodardev received his education along with his two brothers under Kalpacandra of Navadwip in Bengal, where they studied detailed grammar, derivations and usage of words, four Vedas, fourteen scriptures, Gita, Bhagavata Purana and other religious books.

Time with Sankardev and Sattra
Early biographers of Damodardev are unanimous that he was inspired and influenced by Sankardev in his religious practice and he began proselytising in Barpeta. After meeting Damodar, Sankardev asked him to recite Bhagavata in his Sattra for which Damodar replied "Yours is the land where tree of Bhakti can grow", and this marked the beginning of friendship between them. Sankara requested him to initiate Brahmin disciples. Sankardev also initiated Damodardev to the Mahapurushiya cult.

See also
 Durgabar Kayastha
 Bhusana Dvija

Notes

References

 

 

16th-century Hindu religious leaders
16th-century Indian scholars
1483 births
1598 deaths
Ekasarana Dharma
People from Nagaon district
Scholars from Assam